Anna Campori (22 September 1917 – 19 January 2018) was an Italian actress. From 1951 onwards, she appeared in 70 films.

Life and career 
Born in Rome, Italy, after the debut on stage in a small company of prose Campori moved shortly after into avanspettacolo and revue, entering the company of the De Vico Brothers with whom she toured across Italy during the Second World War.
 
After her marriage to Pietro De Vico, she became the prima donna in the companies he founded, even still appearing on several stage comedies of other companies.

Campori was also an active character actress for films and television series, a voice actress and a radio hostess. She made her last appearance in the TV series Carabinieri.

She turned 100 in September 2017 and died on 19 January 2018.

Selected filmography

 Una bruna indiavolata! (1951) – Signora Cartoni
 We Two Alone (1952) – Fillide
 Neapolitan Turk (1953) – Concettella
 La pattuglia dell'Amba Alagi (1953) – Moglie del sindaco
 The Doctor of the Mad (1954) – Una signora
 It Happened at the Police Station (1954) – The woman protesting against the strike
 Assi alla ribalta (1954)
 The Song of the Heart (1955) – Maddalena
 L'ultimo amante (1955) – La nuova inquilina
 Il coraggio (1955) – Ginevra
 Suor Maria (1955) – Cameriera della pensione
 La ragazza di via Veneto (1955)
 I giorni più belli (1956) – La madre di Carletto
 Ci sposeremo a Capri (1956) – Pasquale Caputo's Wife
 Occhi senza luce (1956) – Maid
 Il canto dell'emigrante (1956)
 Song of Naples (1957) – Oreste Antignano's Wife
 Susanna Whipped Cream (1957) – La madre di Susanna
 La canzone del destino (1957)
 C'è un sentiero nel cielo (1957) – The Restaurant Owner
 Serenate per 16 bionde (1957) – The Woman enjoying the Show
 Il cocco di mamma (1957) – Laura Tarantini's Mother
 A sud niente di nuovo (1957)
 Venice, the Moon and You (1958) – Claudia
 Mia nonna poliziotto (1958) – Padrona di casa
 Toto, Peppino and the Fanatics (1958)
 The Friend of the Jaguar (1959) – Gianna
 Prepotenti più di prima (1959) – Signora Norma
 I Tartassati (1959) – Dora Pezzella
 Le cameriere (1959) – La signora Marini
 Winter Holidays (1959) – Virginia
 Quel tesoro di papà (1959) – Amalia
 Ferdinando I, re di Napoli (1959) – The angry Lottery Player (uncredited)
 Perfide.... ma belle (1959)
 Nel blu dipinto di blu (1959) – Donata's 1st Employer (uncredited)
 The Employee (1960) – Lisetta
 Gastone (1960)
 I piaceri dello scapolo (1960) – La Padrona di Casa
 My Friend, Dr. Jekyll (1960) – Clarissa de Matteis
 Caccia al marito (1960) – The Widow with seven children
 Who Hesitates Is Lost (1960) – Italia, Guardalavecchia's wife
 Sua Eccellenza si fermò a mangiare (1961) – The Innkeeper's Wife (uncredited)
 Pesci d'oro e bikini d'argento (1961)
 Leoni al sole (1961)
 Rocco e le sorelle (1961)
 I soliti rapinatori a Milano (1963)
 Le motorizzate (1963) – Cacace's Wife (segment "Il Vigile Ignoto")
 Gli onorevoli (1963) – Signora La Trippa
 The Four Musketeers (1963)
 Napoleone a Firenze (1964)
 Te lo leggo negli occhi (1965) – Elsa
 Ischia operazione amore (1966) – Rosalia – Gennaro's wife
 Una ragazza tutta d'oro (1967) – Iva Zanelli's Mother
 Riderà! (Cuore matto) (1967) – Madre di Antonio
 Ric e Gian alla conquista del West (1967) – Irene Jefferson
 Cuore matto... matto da legare (1967)
 I ragazzi di Bandiera Gialla (1968)
 Il suo nome è Donna Rosa (1969) – Carmela
 Io non spezzo... rompo (1971) – Elena – wife of Riccardo
 Storia di fifa e di coltello – Er seguito d'er più (1972) – Teresa Landolfi ved. Campitelli
 City Under Siege (1974)
 Pierino medico della Saub (1981) – Suor Celestina
 Giggi il bullo (1982)
 No Thanks, Coffee Makes Me Nervous (1982)
 Ladri di futuro (1991)
 The Accidental Detective (2003) – Gegia
 Those Happy Years (2013) – Bisnonna

See also
 List of centenarians (actors, filmmakers and entertainers)

References

External links

1917 births
2018 deaths
20th-century Italian actresses
Actresses from Rome
Italian centenarians
Italian film actresses
Women centenarians